Justin Stephen (born 1988)is a former Indian football player as a centre back

Early career
Justin is raised from the Uzhavoor village of Kottayam district in Central Kerala. He completed his studies at OLLHS, Uzhavoor and went for further studies at Christ College

The defender started his Football career with Unity Soccer Club, Thodupuzha and later went on to play for his college side of Christ College.

Career
The turning point of Justin’s career came when the Kerala side Viva Kerala signed him the in 2006 during their pursuit for top division football.

Justin could only manage one year at Viva, as his potentials were spotted by the premier club Mahindra United. He signed a contract with Mahindra United in 2007.

Justin stayed at the Mumbai club till its shut down in 2010. He was acquired by Chirag United and represented the team for the two seasons.

Then he signed for Mumbai F.C. for the 2012-13 season. He signed for Mohammedan S.C. in 2013. Justin rejoined Mumbai F.C. in 2014.

In July 2015 Stephen was drafted to play for Chennaiyin in the 2015 Indian Super League.

Personal life
Stephen is a supporter of the Brazil national football team and considers John Terry of England as his role model. Indian International Steven Dias is also one of his favourites.

His brother Listin Stephen is a producer and director of Indian films, Justin has worked in his production company Magic Frames as a producer of Malayalam films.

References

External links
 Goal Profile
 

Indian footballers
1988 births
Living people
Sportspeople from Kottayam
Footballers from Kerala
I-League players
Mahindra United FC players
United SC players
Mumbai FC players
Mohammedan SC (Kolkata) players
Chennaiyin FC players
Association football defenders